Efraim Kronqvist (2 August 1874, Sortavala - 22 May 1918, Hausjärvi) was a Finnish house painter and politician. He was a member of the Parliament of Finland from 1909 to 1913, representing the Social Democratic Party of Finland (SDP). In 1918 he was imprisoned for having sided with the Reds during the Finnish Civil War. He died in detention.

References

1874 births
1918 deaths
People from Sortavala
People from Viipuri Province (Grand Duchy of Finland)
Social Democratic Party of Finland politicians
Members of the Parliament of Finland (1909–10)
Members of the Parliament of Finland (1910–11)
Members of the Parliament of Finland (1911–13)
People of the Finnish Civil War (Red side)
Prisoners who died in Finnish detention